Schedophilus is a genus of fish in the family Centrolophidae, the medusafish. The genus has a global distribution.

Species
There are currently eight recognized species in this genus:
 Schedophilus griseolineatus (Norman, 1937)
 Schedophilus haedrichi Chirichigno F., 1973 (Mocosa ruff)
 Schedophilus huttoni (Waite, 1910) (New Zealand ruffe)
 Schedophilus maculatus Günther, 1860 (Pelagic butterfish)
 Schedophilus medusophagus (Cocco, 1839) (Cornish blackfish)
 Schedophilus ovalis (G. Cuvier, 1833) (Imperial blackfish)
 Schedophilus pemarco (Poll, 1959) (Pemarco blackfish)
 Schedophilus velaini (Sauvage, 1879) (African barrelfish)

References

External links

 
 

Centrolophidae
Marine fish genera
Ray-finned fish genera
Taxa named by Anastasio Cocco